Paul Enock (9 July 1934 – 24 February 2013) was a Canadian speed skater. He competed in two events at the 1968 Winter Olympics.

References

External links
 

1934 births
2013 deaths
Canadian male speed skaters
Olympic speed skaters of Canada
Speed skaters at the 1968 Winter Olympics
Sportspeople from Sydney
Cyclists at the 1958 British Empire and Commonwealth Games
Canadian male cyclists
Commonwealth Games competitors for Canada
20th-century Canadian people